The Inner Mongolian People's Revolutionary Party was a political party in Inner Mongolia. The party was founded by a number of politically active Inner Mongolian youth including Mersé and Serengdongrub in Kalgan in October 1925 in Zhangjiakou. Mersé, who had contacts with the Mongolian People's Revolutionary Party and Comintern, became the general secretary of the party. Others present at their inaugural meeting included Altanochir, Fumintai, and Sainbayar.

The party advocated Mongolian self-determination and socialism, abolishment of feudalism and of the influence of the religious hierarchy.

The party was allied to the Chinese Communist Party. It was dissolved in 1946.

References

External links

Comintern sections
Communist parties in China
History of Inner Mongolia
Inner Mongolian independence movement
Political parties in the Republic of China
Political parties established in 1925
Political parties disestablished in 1946
Formerly ruling communist parties
Organizations associated with the Chinese Communist Party
History of Zhangjiakou